This list of museums in Berkshire, England contains museums which are defined for this context as institutions (including nonprofit organizations, government entities, and private businesses) that collect and care for objects of cultural, artistic, scientific, or historical interest and make their collections or related exhibits available for public viewing. Also included are non-profit art galleries and university art galleries.  Museums that exist only in cyberspace (i.e., virtual museums) are not included.

See also
 :Category:Tourist attractions in Berkshire

References
 Visit Britain: Berkshire Museums 
 Visit Southeast England

 
Berkshire
Museums